Barry Horne may refer to:

Barry Horne (activist) (1952–2001), British animal rights activist
Barry Horne (footballer) (born 1962), Welsh footballer
Barry Horne (racing driver) (born 1977), British racing driver